Chief Justice of Hong Kong may refer to:
 Chief Justice of the Court of Final Appeal, position created in 1997 as the head of the Judiciary and of Court of Final Appeal, the latter replacing the Judicial Committee of the Privy Council
 Chief Justice of the Supreme Court of Hong Kong, position existed before 1997 as the head of the Supreme Court and of the Judiciary, the former role was replaced by the Chief Judge of the High Court in 1997, and the latter by the Chief Justice of the Court of Final Appeal